The beach volleyball competitions for men's and women's teams at the 2019 Pacific Games was held in Apia, Samoa on 8–12 July 2019 at the Apia Waterfront.

Teams
The nations competing were:

Medal summary

Medal table

Results

Men's tournament

Pool stage
The sixteen beach volleyball men's pairs were seeded into four pools and a four-team bracket was played within each pool. Teams with two wins after this stage – i.e. the top-ranked side from each pool – advanced directly to the quarter-finals. 

Teams losing their first pool match played off, and the losing sides from those games were eliminated. The playoff winners each played a crossover match against a second-placed side from another pool in a repechage to determine the remaining quarter-finalists.

Pool A

Pool B

Pool C

Pool D

Playoffs – repechage matches

Finals matches
The winners of each pool – the teams from Tuvalu, Samoa, Tonga and Australia – advanced directly to the quarter-finals. Their respective opponents in the round of eight – American Samoa, Tahiti, Kiribati, and Papua New Guinea – won through via repechage match playoffs.

The Australia pair of Tim Dickson and Marcus Ferguson won the final, overcoming an injury to Dickson during the first set to defeat Tahiti in three sets, while Tonga took out the bronze medal by defeating American Samoa, also in three sets.

Women's tournament

Pool matches
Pool A

Pool B

Pool C

Playoffs – elimination matches

Finals
The Vanuatu women's team of Miller Pata (née Elwin) and Sherysyn Toko won gold, defeating the Tahiti women's pair in straight sets in the final. American Samoa defeated Solomon Islands for the bronze.

See also
 Volleyball at the 2019 Pacific Games
 Beach volleyball at the Pacific Games

References

Volleyball at the 2019 Pacific Games
Pacific Games
Beach volleyball at the Pacific Games